Ovacık is a town and district of Karabük Province in the Black Sea region of Turkey. According to the 2000 census, population of the district is 5,455 of which 1,728 live in the town of Ovacık. She is the smallest district in Karabük Province. She was a township in Çerkeş district between 1923-1957 and was the district in Çankırı Province between 1957 and 1995.

Notes

References

External links
 District municipality's official website 

Populated places in Karabük Province
Districts of Karabük Province
Towns in Turkey